Negocio & Estilo de Vida (simply Negocio) is a free subscription business daily newspaper published in Madrid, Spain.

History and profile
Negocio was established in April 2006. Its first issue was published on 23 May 2006. The paper is the first free subscription business newspaper in Spain. The publisher is Tumbo de privilegios, S.L., a subsidiary of Grupo Promecal.

The circulation of Negocio in March 2007 was 68,000 copies. In 2007 the paper had a circulation of 63,097 copies on weekdays. In 2010 it sold 65,514 copies.

See also
List of newspapers in Spain

References

2006 establishments in Spain
Business newspapers
Free daily newspapers
Daily newspapers published in Spain
Newspapers published in Madrid
Publications established in 2006
Spanish-language newspapers